Island council elections were held in the Netherlands Antilles in April 1979. They were the eighth elections for the Island Council.

Aruba

Results

Saba

General elections were held in Saba on 27 April 1979. The result was a victory for the Windward Islands People's Movement, which won all five Island Council seats.

Results

Sint Maarten

General elections were held in Sint Maarten on 27 April 1979 to elect the 5 members of the Island Council. The result was a victory for the Democratic Party, which won three of the five Island Council seats.

Results

References

Aruba
Election and referendum articles with incomplete results